Bell Creek (also called Bells Creek) is a stream in Pulaski County in the U.S. state of Missouri. It is a tributary of the Gasconade River.

Bell Creek has the name of the local Bell family.

See also
List of rivers of Missouri

References

Rivers of Pulaski County, Missouri
Rivers of Missouri